The Commonwealth Turf Stakes is a Grade III American Thoroughbred horse race for three-year-olds run over a distance of one and one sixteenth miles on turf held annually in November  at Churchill Downs in Louisville, Kentucky during the fall meeting.

History
The event was inaugurated on 14 November 2004 and was won by the shortest of margins, a nose by the 18-1 outsider in field Broadway View, who was trained by US Hall of Fame trained Nick Zito in a time of 1:44.75.

The American Graded Stakes Committee classified the event as Grade III in 2008. 

The event was not scheduled to be run in 2020.

Records
Speed record
 1:41.54 - Heart to Heart (2014)

Margins 
 lengths - Almasty  (2015) 

Most wins by an owner
 No owner has won this race more than once.

Most wins by a jockey
 2 - Shaun Bridgmohan (2007, 2013)

Most wins by a trainer
 2 - Brad H. Cox  (2015, 2017)
 2 - Steve Asmussen (2007, 2018)

Winners

Legend:

See also
 List of American and Canadian Graded races

External site
 Churchill Downs Media Guide - $175,000 Commonwealth Turf (Grade III)

References

Graded stakes races in the United States
Grade 3 stakes races in the United States
Turf races in the United States
Horse races in the United States
Recurring sporting events established in 2004
Churchill Downs horse races
2004 establishments in Kentucky